Dead and Gone is an EP by American industrial rock band Stabbing Westward, released on January 3, 2020 through Drugstore Records. It is the band's first release since 2001's Stabbing Westward.

Background
Stabbing Westward released its self-titled fourth album was released on May 22, 2001. The single "So Far Away" received moderate radio play on rock stations, but the album was a commercial failure. The band would breakup in early 2002, with most of the band members pursuing other projects. After the band's split, Christopher Hall would commit full-time to The Dreaming, which he co-founded with Johnny Haro. Rumors of Stabbing Westward reuniting started to form in June 2010, but nothing came of this. Walter Flakus would reunite with Hall in November 2013, performing with The Dreaming at a show in Las Vegas. Stabbing Westward officially reformed in 2016 to play two live shows to coincide with the band's 30th anniversary. The lineup for the reunited band consisted of Christopher Hall (vocals, guitar), Walter Falkus (keyboards, programming), Mark Eliopulos (guitar, backing vocals), Carlton Bost (bass), and Johnny Haro (drums). Stabbing Westward went on several tours throughout 2017 and 2018 and released the new song "Home in You" for the Cold Waves VI compilation on September 28, 2017. Haro was fired from the band in 2018 and replaced by former Orgy drummer Bobby Amaro; Haro's departure from Stabbing Westward also coincided with The Dreaming breaking up. In 2019, the band released a re-recorded version of the Iwo Jesus EP. In June of that year, the band announced that they were working on a new album and that Eliopulos had left the band.

Reception

Dead and Gone has received positive reviews.

AllMusic's Neil Z. Yeung stated that the EP doesn't miss a beat and contains "all the hallmarks that made them underrated favorites in their brief late-'90s run." Yeung favorably compared the title track to previous singles "Shame" and "Save Yourself". Yeung praised Hall's vocals on "Crawl", a re-worked song originally by The Dreaming, saying his vocals "haven't aged a day."

The EP was included on AllMusic's "Best of 2020" list.

Track listing

Personnel
Stabbing Westward
 Christopher Hall - lead vocals, guitars, keyboards, drum machine programming
 Walter Flakus - keyboards, programming, backing vocals
 Carlton Bost - bass
 Bobby Amaro - drums

See also
List of 2020 albums

References

2020 EPs
Stabbing Westward albums
Industrial rock EPs